The 12615 / 12616 Grand Trunk Express (commonly called G.T. or G.T. Express) is a daily Superfast Express train on Indian Railways, running between  and Chennai Central. It is a historic train and is one of the oldest trains starting services in 1929. It originally ran between Peshawar in Undivided India(then capital of the North West Frontier Province) and Mangalore Central in Karnataka (then in the Madras Presidency).. From September 2021, it runs with modern new LHB coach with revised coach position.

History
For most of the 19th century, the main railway route from Madras to Calcutta and Delhi was through Bombay. The Madras–Bombay mail train carried through carriages between Madras and Manmad which were detached at Daund. Passengers would then transfer to the Great Indian Peninsular Railway's Calcutta Mail at Manmad to proceed to the northern and the eastern parts of the country. The East Coast line between Madras and Calcutta opened in 1900, providing a shorter route for the passengers bound to Calcutta, but the passengers bound to Delhi, Lahore and other major cities in the north, continued to rely on the Madras–Manmad mail service.

A record in through-train running was set in 1921 by a military train conveying families of a regiment from Peshawar to Cannanore (now Kannur in Kerala). The journey represented a continuous run of over 2500 miles over the North Western Railway (British India), Great Indian Peninsular Railway, Madras and Southern Mahratta Railway and the South Indian Railway. The link was opened throughout on 15 November 1928 with the commissioning of the Asifabad Road –  section. This link reduced the distance between Madras and Delhi by over 200 miles.

From 1 April 1929 the 'Grand Trunk' express commenced operating as two through carriages running between Peshawar in the North Western Railway (British India) and Mangalore in the South Indian Railway. The two coaches, consisting of a composite First and Second class coach and a composite Third class and Luggage coach, made their way to Madras attached to the South Indian Railway's Mangalore–Madras mail train. Between Madras and Itarsi sectional coaches to Itarsi, Bezwada (now Vijayawada) and Hyderabad were operated. At Itarsi, the two through coaches from Mangalore were attached to the Great Indian Peninsular Railway's Bombay–Delhi service. In the final leg of the journey between Delhi and Peshawar, the two through carriages were attached to the Frontier Mail and reached Peshawar traveling through Bathinda, Ferozepore and Lahore. Thus the train covered a distance of 2497 miles in a little over 96 hours. This was not an independent train and the name 'Grand Trunk express' only referred to the 2 through carriages operating between Mangalore and Peshawar.

Shortly after the inauguration of the service, from 15 October 1929, the two through carriages operating between Mangalore and Peshawar were restricted to run between Mettupalayam and Delhi with Slip Coach to Peshawar/Landi Kotal . From 1 March 1930, the service was extended to Lahore.

As the train consisted of only 2 through coaches, it proved insufficient to meet the traffic requirements. In addition, the train's schedule depended on the schedules of the trains carrying the through carriages, and was thus subject to regular delays. This led to a revision in the operation of the train and the revamped 'Grand Trunk express' commenced operating as a dedicated daily train between Madras and Delhi from 1 September 1930. The rakes used for the train were supplied by the Great Indian Peninsular Railway for the next few years.

Until the mid-1960s, the Grand Trunk Express completed the 1356 mile journey between Madras and New Delhi in about 50 hours. After the introduction of the Dakshin Express in 1968, the Grand Trunk Express was moved to a faster schedule. For a few years after the change in schedule, the train operated as a fully air-conditioned service for two days every week and with a mixed consist on the remaining 5 days. In time, the air-conditioned service was discontinued. Today, the train covers the 2182.4 kilometer journey in 35 hours and 15 minutes, with 40 halts (exclusive of the terminals) at an average speed of 62kmph.

Timings

12615 Chennai Central - New Delhi Grand Trunk Express leaves Chennai Central at 18.50 and reaches New Delhi by 06.35 the third day. 

12616 New Delhi - Chennai Central Grand Trunk Express leaves New Delhi by 16.10 and reaches Chennai Central by 04.30 the third day.

Schedule and Service

The train passes through the states of Tamil Nadu, Andhra Pradesh, Telangana, Maharashtra, Madhya Pradesh, Rajasthan, Uttar Pradesh, Haryana and Delhi.

As per the numbering of the Indian Railways, the train has been assigned the numbers 12615/12616, with 12615 being assigned for the Chennai Central (MAS) – New Delhi (NDLS) run and 12616 for the New Delhi (NDLS) – Chennai Central (MAS) run.

Coach Composition

It runs with LHB coach. It has a total of 22 coaches.

 1 AC First Class Cum AC Two Tier
 2 AC Two Tier
 6 AC Three Tier
 6 Sleeper class
 1 Pantry car
 4 General Unreserved
 1 Luggage Cum Disabled Coach (LHB) 
 1 End On Generator Car

Route & Halts
The important halts of Grand Trunk Express are;

Traction
It is hauled by a Royapuram based WAP-7 locomotive  on its entire journey.

Gallery

See also
 Andaman Express
 Vivek Express
 Himsagar Express
 Kerala Express
 Thirukural Express
 Ganga Kaveri Express

References

External links

 Indian Railways Official Site
 GT Express Route Map

Transport in Chennai
Transport in Delhi
Named passenger trains of India
Express trains in India
Rail transport in Tamil Nadu
Rail transport in Madhya Pradesh
Rail transport in Andhra Pradesh
Rail transport in Telangana
Rail transport in Delhi
Rail transport in Uttar Pradesh
Rail transport in Rajasthan
Rail transport in Haryana
Railway services introduced in 1929